Paitoon Tiebma (born September 13, 1981) is a retired professional footballer from Thailand.

International career
Paitoon was called up to the national team, in coach Peter Withe first squad selection for the 2002 Asian Games, 2002 Tiger Cup winners and squad selection for the 2004 Asian Cup.

Honours

Club
Osotsapa F.C
 Kor Royal Cup Winners (1) : 2002

International
Thailand
 ASEAN Football Championship Winners (1) : 2002

References

1981 births
Living people
Paitoon Tiepma
Paitoon Tiepma
Association football fullbacks
Paitoon Tiepma
Persijap Jepara players
Paitoon Tiepma
Paitoon Tiepma
Paitoon Tiepma
Paitoon Tiepma
Thai expatriate footballers
Liga 1 (Indonesia) players
Thai expatriate sportspeople in Indonesia
Expatriate footballers in Indonesia
Paitoon Tiepma
Footballers at the 2002 Asian Games
Paitoon Tiepma